Wayne Patrick Wilschut (born 12 June 1986) is a South African rugby union player for the  in the Currie Cup and the Rugby Challenge. His regular position is number eight and flanker.

Rugby career

Boland youth rugby

Wilschut was born in Worcester in the Western Cape. In 2004, he was selected to represent Boland at the premier high school tournament in South Africa, the Under-18 Craven Week, in Nelspruit, where he started all three of his side's matches in the number eight jersey. The following year, he was a member of the  side that participated in the 2005 Under-19 Provincial Championship.

Leopards and NWU Pukke

Wilschut then made the move to Potchefstroom, where he joined the Leopards' youth team. He played for the  team in both 2006 and 2007, and also made three appearances as a replacement for university side  in the inaugural edition of the Varsity Cup in 2008.

Villagers Worcester

Wilschut then returned to his hometown of Worcester, where he played amateur club rugby for Villagers Worcester, also captaining the team. The team won the Boland Premier League in 2012 to qualify for the inaugural edition of the SARU Community Cup in 2013. Wilschut started all four of their matches in Pool A of the competition, of which the team won just one to finish fourth, failing to qualify for the finals.

Villagers Worcester again won the Boland Premier League in 2014 to qualify for the 2015 SARU Community Cup. Wilschut made three appearances in the competition, scoring a try in their 35–41 defeat to Hamiltons as they emulated their 2013 record by finishing in fourth spot in Pool C, winning a single match.

Boland Cavaliers

Wilschut joined his local province  on a full-time basis for 2015. He was included in their squad for the 2015 Vodacom Cup and made his first class debut on 21 March 2015 – aged  – by starting their season-opener against  in Caledon. He became a fixture in the team, starting all seven of their matches in a disappointing season for his side, that finished bottom of the Southern Section log with just a single victory to their name. He also started all six of their matches in the 2015 Currie Cup qualification series, in which Boland finished fourth to progress to the Currie Cup First Division for the rest of the season. He started all five of their matches in the First Division – which meant he started all 18 of the Boland Cavaliers' matches in his debut season – as the season ended in disappointment as Boland finished in fifth place, failing to get a semi-final berth.

Wilschut slipped down the pecking order in 2015, as he was mainly used as a replacement during the 2016 Currie Cup qualification competition that effectively replaced the Vodacom Cup. He made just two starts in the competition, but played off the bench in eleven of their remaining twelve matches. He helped the Boland Cavaliers finish in third position on the log, which meant the team qualified for the Currie Cup Premier Division for the first time since 2009. He scored his first try of his senior career shortly before half-time, but could not prevent his team falling to a 12–60 defeat to the defending champions. Wilschut made three further appearances as a replacement during the remainder of the competition, to help his team finish in seventh place on the log.

References

South African rugby union players
Living people
1986 births
Rugby union players from Worcester, South Africa
Rugby union flankers
Rugby union number eights
Boland Cavaliers players
SWD Eagles players